Crystelle-Ida Ngnipoho-Pokam (Born April 24, 1987) is a Cameroonian soccer player. 

Ngnipoho-Pokam plays on the Cameroonian national team. From 01/2009-12/2009 Ngnipoho-Pokam played for AS Génie and from 07/2008-12/2008 she played for the FF USV Jena.

Position 
Ngnipoho-Pokam  is a defender.

References 

1987 births
Living people
People from Bafoussam
Cameroonian women's footballers
Women's association football defenders

Cameroonian expatriate women's footballers
Cameroonian expatriate sportspeople in Germany
Expatriate women's footballers in Germany
21st-century Cameroonian women
20th-century Cameroonian women